John Bramwell Alderson (10 April 1916 – 4 August 2006) was an English actor noted for playing the lead in the 1957–58 syndicated western television series, Boots and Saddles, which ran for thirty-eight episodes in a single season, and many supporting roles in films in a career spanning almost forty years, from 1951 to 1990.

Alderson was cast as the rugged trail guide Hugh Glass, an historical figure, in the 1966 episode "Hugh Glass Meets the Bear" of the syndicated series, Death Valley Days. Others in the episode were Morgan Woodward as Thomas Fitzpatrick, Victor French as Louis Baptiste and Tris Coffin.

Biography 

Alderson was born to a mining family in the village of Horden, County Durham, England.  After a brief teenage career at the colliery he opted to instead join the Royal Artillery, rising to the rank of Major. Upon leaving the services he married a United States citizen and immigrated to the US, where he began his acting career.

Filmography

Film

Selected television appearances

 Black Saddle (1959) - Big Sam Davis
 Walt Disney's Wonderful World of Color (1958-1959, Episodes: "The Swamp Fox" and "Texas John Slaughter") - Sgt. Duncan MacGregor / Sergeant McDonald
 Yancy Derringer (1958) - Marble Fingers
 Lawman (1959) - Jack Brace
 Border Patrol (1959) - Curley
 Colt .45 (1959) - Captain
 Hudson's Bay (1959) - Boggs
 Adventures in Paradise (1960-1961) - Sean Casey / Darcy / Palsson / Harry Pine
 Follow the Sun (1961) - Mervin Taggert
 Have Gun – Will Travel (1958-1962) - Rusty Doggett / Max Clay
 Maverick (1959-1962) - Simon Girty / Captain Bly / Zindler / Ben Chapman
 Tales of Wells Fargo (1960-1962) - Gage / Clay Arvin
 Bronco (1962) - Francis Randolph
 Going My Way (1963) - Mr. Larkin
 Gunsmoke (1955-1963) - Canby / Ab Laster / Nash
 Arrest and Trial (1963) - Bartender
 The Alfred Hitchcock Hour (1964) - The 3rd Guard
 Combat! (1964) - Sgt. Rawlings
 The Rogues (1965) - Bill
 Bonanza (1961-1966) - Hugh Gwylnedd / Montague
 Blue Light (1966) - Gorlek / Gorleck
 Doctor Who (1966, in the serial The Gunfighters) - Wyatt Earp
 Death Valley Days (1964-1966) - John Tunstall / Hank Butterford / Hugh Glass / Joe Meek / Big Mac
 The Wild Wild West (1967) - Clive Marchmount
 The Guns of Will Sonnett (1968) - Sheriff
 Mission: Impossible (1970) - Follet
 The Persuaders! (1971) - Kyle Sandor
 Rod Serling's Night Gallery (1972) - Granger (segment "Lindemann's Catch")
 Philip Marlowe, Private Eye (1983) - Gaff Talley

In 1966, the first four episodes of Blue Light were edited together to create the theatrical film I Deal in Danger. Alderson's Blue Light appearance was included in the film.

References

External links
 

English male film actors
English male television actors
1916 births
2006 deaths
Actors from County Durham
English emigrants to the United States
People from Horden
British Army personnel of World War II
Royal Artillery officers
Western (genre) television actors